Wanyan Zonggan (完顏宗幹; died 1141), personal name Woben, formally known as Prince of Liao (遼王), was an imperial prince of the Jurchen–led Jin Dynasty. There is no record of his birth year. Wanyan Zonggan was a Grand Preceptor of Jin.

Family 
Wives

 Empress Cixian, of the Da clan (慈憲皇后 大氏; d. 1153) from Bohai
 Digunai (24 February 1122 – 15 December 1161), sinicised name Wanyan Liang, Prince of Hailing (海陵王), became Emperor of the Jin dynasty, second son

 Another son or daughter
 Lady Li, of the Li clan (李氏)

References 

 
 
 

Jin dynasty (266–420) imperial princes
1141 deaths
Year of birth unknown